Fabrício de Carvalho Silva (born 18 February 1978), or simply Fabrício Carvalho, is a Brazilian footballer who plays as a striker for Taboão da Serra.

Contract
Goiás: 5 February 2007 to 4 February 2010
Bragantino: 27 November 2010 to 31 May 2011

External links
 sambafoot
 Guardian Stats Centre
 CBF
 zerozero.pt
 goiasesporteclube.com
 interview

1978 births
Living people
Brazilian footballers
Brazilian expatriate footballers
Campeonato Brasileiro Série A players
Campeonato Brasileiro Série B players
União Agrícola Barbarense Futebol Clube players
C.D. Nacional players
Associação Atlética Ponte Preta players
Associação Desportiva São Caetano players
Goiás Esporte Clube players
Clube Atlético Bragantino players
Oeste Futebol Clube players
Guaratinguetá Futebol players
Associação Desportiva Cabofriense players
Clube Atlético Taboão da Serra players
Expatriate footballers in Portugal

Association football forwards
People from Andradina